White trash is an American pejorative term for poor white people, especially in rural areas.

White trash may also refer to:

 White Trash (film), American title of Luis Buñuel's film The Young One (1960)

Books
 White Trash (novel), John King (2002)
 White Trash, a novel by Alexandra Allred (2016)
 White Trash: Moronic Inferno, a comic by Gordon Rennie
 White Trash: The 400-Year Untold History of Class in America, a book by historian Nancy Isenberg

Music

Bands
 White Trash (Scottish band), a British pop group
 White Trash (American band), an American funk metal band
 Edgar Winter's White Trash, an American R&B band

Songs
 "White Trash", a 1983 song by the Argentine band Sumo
 "White Trash", a song by Orchestral Manoeuvres in the Dark from their 1984 album Junk Culture
 "White Trash", a 1995 song by Southern Culture on the Skids
 "White Trash", a song on the Junior Senior album D-D-Don't Stop the Beat
 "White Trash", the debut single by New Zealand band Steriogram
 "White Trash", a single released in 2008 by electro-industrial band Funker Vogt
 "White Trash (2nd Generation)", a song by Bad Religion from their 1981 album How Could Hell Be Any Worse?

See also

 Poor White Trash, a 2000 film by Michael Addis
 Poor White Trash, alternate release title of the 1957 film Bayou
 White Trash with Money, a 2006 Toby Keith album
 White Trash Cooking, a 1986 cookbook by Ernest Matthew Mickler
 Po' White Trash, a 1900 play by Evelyn Greenleaf Sutherland